Nadezhda Frolenkova (born 27 June 1989) is a Ukrainian former competitive ice dancer. With partner Vitali Nikiforov, she is a two-time Ukrainian national silver medalist. They were assigned to the 2014 World Championships in Saitama, but were forced to withdraw due to Frolenkova's back injury.

With earlier partner Mikhail Kasalo, she won bronze medals at the 2011 Winter Universiade, 2008 Golden Spin of Zagreb and two ISU Junior Grand Prix events, and placed as high as 13th at the European Championships, in 2011.

Programs

With Kasalo

Competitive highlights

With Nikiforov

With Kasalo

References

External links 

 
 

Ukrainian female ice dancers
Figure skaters at the 2007 Winter Universiade
1989 births
Living people
Sportspeople from Kharkiv
Universiade medalists in figure skating
Universiade bronze medalists for Ukraine
Competitors at the 2009 Winter Universiade
Competitors at the 2013 Winter Universiade
21st-century Ukrainian women
20th-century Ukrainian women